The twenty-eighth season of the Case Closed anime was directed by Yasuichiro Yamamoto and produced by TMS Entertainment and Yomiuri Telecasting Corporation. The series is based on Gosho Aoyama's Case Closed manga series. In Japan, the series is titled  but was changed due to legal issues with the title Detective Conan. The episodes' plot follows Conan Edogawa's daily adventures.

The episodes use six pieces of theme music: three openings and three endings.

The first opening theme is Everything OK!! by Cellchrome used for episodes 887 (season 27) - 902.

The second opening theme is Countdown by NormCore used for episodes 903 - 915.

The second ending theme is Sadame by First place and starts at episode 909 and was used until episode 914.

The third opening theme is Timeline by dps and starts at episode 916 and was used until episode 926. 

The third ending theme is Aozolighter by Cellchrome and starts at episode 915 and was used until episode 926. 

The season began airing on April 7, 2018 through December 22, 2018 on Nippon Television Network System in Japan. The season was later collected and released in eight DVD compilations by Shogakukan between February 28, 2020 and September 25, 2020, in Japan. Crunchyroll began simulcasting the series in October 2014, starting with episode 754. 



Episode list

References

Season28
2018 Japanese television seasons
2019 Japanese television seasons